This is a list of named geological features on Europa, a moon of the planet Jupiter. Craters and lineae are listed on separate pages: list of craters on Europa and list of lineae on Europa.

Cavi
Cavi are irregular steep-sided depressions that do not seem to be impact craters.

Chaos

On Europa, regions of chaotic terrain are named after places in Celtic mythology.

Flexūs

A flexus is a low, curved ridge with a scalloped pattern. Europan flexūs are named after the places visited by Europa during her journey with Zeus the bull.

Fossae
Fossae are named after ancient Celtic ancient stone rows.

Large ringed features

These impact structures are named after important locations in ancient history.

Maculae

Europan maculae (dark spots) are named after locations in Greek mythology, especially in the legend of Cadmus and his search for his sister, Europa.

Mensae

Regiones

Europan regiones (regions) are named after locations in Celtic mythology.

External links

USGS, IAU: Europa nomenclature

 
Europa